is a passenger railway station located in the town of Matsuno, Kitauwa District, Ehime Prefecture, Japan. It is operated by JR Shikoku and has the station number "G36".

Lines

Layout
The station consists of a side platform serving a single track. A shelter is provided for passengers on the platform. Immediately behind the platform is an enclosed waiting room and a toilet shed. A ramp leads up from the access road to the platform. Next to the ramp is a bike shed and a public telephone call box. The station is wheelchair accessible.

Adjacent stations

|-
!colspan=5|JR Shikoku

History
The station opened on 01 October 1960 under the control of Japanese National Railways. After the privatization of JNR on 1 April 1987, control of the station passed to JR Shikoku.

Surrounding area
Hiromi River

See also
 List of railway stations in Japan

References

External links
Station timetable

Railway stations in Ehime Prefecture
Yodo Line
Railway stations in Japan opened in 1960
Matsuno, Ehime